Pizzicato Five in the Mix is a 2001 Pizzicato Five album.

Track listing
 "Bloopers (Introduction)" - 0:41
 "Baby Portable Rock - My Baby Portable Player Sound" - 3:31
 "Flower Drum Song (Satoshi's Lament) (Remix - Satoshi Tomiie)" - 3:53
 "Go Go Dancer" - 1:15
 "Flying High" - 3:01
 "Trailer Music" - 1:47
 "Lemon Kiss" - 0:17
 "Tout Va Bien (Banji-Jump From Corcovado) (Remix - Satoshi Tomiie, Towa Tei)" - 3:27
 "Sweet Thursday" - 4:02
 "What Now, My Love?" - 2:22
 "Voyage À Tokyo" - 0:53
 "Rock 'n' Roll" - 2:10
 "Bossa Nova 3003" - 2:43
 "Spellbound" - 2:30
 "Icecream Meltin' Mellow (Marin Mix 2) (Remix - Yoshinori Sunahara)" - 6:20
 "Sweet Soul Revue" - 2:23
 "Triste" - 4:47
 "Coda" - 0:33
 "T-Fm Jingle" - 0:48
 "It's A Beautiful Day" - 3:09
 "Message Song" - 2:38
 "Le Grand Tokyo" - 0:17
 "I Hear A Symphony" - 4:16
 "Readymade Fm" - 1:17
 "The Night Is Still Young (Kcrw-Fm Live Take)" - 4:08
 "Nata Di Marzo" - 1:41
 "Tokyo Mon Amour" - 3:32
 "Goodbye Baby & Amen" - 7:30

2001 compilation albums
Pizzicato Five albums